This article lists albums that were released by Pure Noise Records.

Studio albums

Compilation albums

Extended plays

Split singles and EPs

Physical singles

References
Primary
 

Secondary

Discographies of American record labels
Punk rock discographies